Luis López Guerra (born 11 November 1947) is a Spanish judge born in León who served as Judge of the European Court of Human Rights until 2018 in respect of Spain.

References

1947 births
Living people
People from León, Spain
20th-century Spanish judges
Judges of the European Court of Human Rights
Members of the 7th Assembly of Madrid
Members of the General Council of the Judiciary
Spanish judges of international courts and tribunals
Members of the Socialist Parliamentary Group (Assembly of Madrid)
21st-century Spanish judges